DIFFA, also known as Design Industries Foundation Fighting AIDS, is an American AIDS charity.

DIFFA marked a 30-year milestone of charity work in 2014.

References

Charity
1984 establishments